William A. Sharsig (1855 – February 1, 1902) was an American Major League Baseball co-owner, general manager, business manager and on field manager of the American Association Philadelphia Athletics, both their first incarnation and their second, which had migrated over from the Players' League. He lived, worked, and was born in Philadelphia.

Managerial career
Sharsig founded the Athletics in September 1880. In 1881, the team went on a barnstorming tour, and Sharsig took on two partners: player Charlie Mason and manager Horace Phillips. After the tour, Phillips jumped ship to the Philadelphia Quakers, a competing team founded by Al Reach (which would eventually become the Philadelphia Phillies), and was replaced on the management team by minstrel show performer Lew Simmons.

As co-owner of the team, Bill named himself manager of his team on several occasions. He finished his career with 238 wins and 216 losses for a .524 winning percentage.

Post-career
Bill died in his hometown of Philadelphia, and was interred at Mount Vernon Cemetery.

References

External links
Baseball Reference – Career Managerial Statistics
Bill Sharsig at SABR (Baseball BioProject)

1855 births
1902 deaths
Burials at Mount Vernon Cemetery (Philadelphia)
Philadelphia Athletics (AA) managers
Philadelphia Athletics (AA 1891) managers
Sportspeople from Philadelphia
Minor league baseball managers